(born 1974 in Kanagawa prefecture) is a Japanese architect.

He acquired his master's degree in architecture and planning at Tokyo National University of Fine Arts and Music in 2000. Ishigami worked with Kazuyo Sejima from 2000 to 2004 at SANAA, before establishing his own firm in 2004: junya.ishigami+associates. 
Ishigami showed solo in the Japanese pavilion at the 11th Venice Architecture Biennale in 2008; and was the youngest ever recipient of the Architectural Institute of Japan Prize for the Kanagawa Institute of Technology KAIT Workshop in 2009. In 2010 he won the Golden Lion for Best Project at the 12th Venice Architecture Biennale, and became an associate professor at Tohoku University in Japan. The same year, his innovative integration of context's complexity to his projects led him to win a Global Award for Sustainable Architecture. In 2014 he was made the Kenzo Tange Design Critic at the Harvard Graduate School of Design in the US. Now he has got an Atelier at the Accademia di Architettura di Mendrisio.

Works
Table exhibit at the Art Basel exhibition, 2006
Balloon exhibit at the "Space for your Future" Exhibiti on, Museum of Contemporary Art, Tokyo,  2007
Japanese pavilion at the Venice Biennale of Architecture, 2008
The Yohji Yamamoto fashion store, New York City, 2008
KAIT Studio for the Kanagawa Institute of Technology in Atsugi, Kanagawa Prefecture, Japan, 2008
 Cloud Arch, a major proposed sculpture for Sydney, Australia. 2017.
Serpentine Galleries Pavilion, 2019

References

External links
VR views of the exhibition “Junya Ishigami, Freeing Architecture” at Fondation Cartier, Paris

Japanese architects
Living people
People from Kanagawa Prefecture
1974 births